Ire Aderinokun is a Nigerian front end developer and Google developer expert. She is Nigeria's first female Google Developer Expert.

Early life and education 
Ire is from Ogun state, Nigeria. She was born into the family of Tayo and Mrs. Olunfunlola Aderinokun.

After her secondary school education in Nigeria she got a bachelor's degree in Experimental Psychology from University of Bristol. While pursuing her master's degree in law at University of Bristol, her interests for computer science made her take a design course at Codeacademy.

Ire is a self-taught frontend developer and user interface designer. She built her first website at the age of 13 as a fansite for Neopets where she had learned her first basic HTML codes. Ire also runs a blog called bitsofcode, where she breaks down coding tips to other developers. She started the blog in 2015.

Career 
Ire is a Google Developer Expert, specializing in the core front-end technologies HTML, CSS, and JavaScript. Ire is also an author at techcabal

She organizes Frontstack, a conference for front-end engineering in Nigeria and started a small scholarship program to sponsor Nigerian women to take a Udacity Nanodegree in a technology-related field of their choice. She is the co-founder, COO and VP Engineering of Helicarrier, which builds cryptocurrency infrastructure for Africa.

Ire Aderinokun is one of the founding members of Feminist Coalition, a group of young Nigerian women with the aim of promoting equality for women in Nigerian society.

References

External links

Official Website

Living people
Nigerian feminists
Nigerian women in business
Nigerian women computer scientists
Nigerian computer scientists
1991 births